Luton Bute Street railway station was the first to be built in Luton, England. It was opened by the Luton, Dunstable and Welwyn Junction Railway Company in 1858, which was an extension of the Welwyn and Hertford Railway. The track to Welwyn was completed in 1860 and taken over by the Great Northern the following year.

History
The station was valuable to Luton people not only for passengers but also for facilitating the London market for the town's trade in plaited straw goods. The station, and the line to Welwyn, closed in 1965.

Following closure to passengers in 1965, the station buildings were quickly demolished despite the line remaining open for freight until 1989–1990. The site of the station was used later as a car park for Luton railway station. Throughout the years, various local pressure groups have been supportive of reopening the station as part of a viable branch line between Dunstable and Luton. In the mid-1990s, there was a debate about reopening it, either with the operation of diesel Class 158s or electric Class 319s.

The site has since been redeveloped, as the new Luton Gateway transport interchange on the Luton to Dunstable Busway guided busway system.

Routes

See also 
 List of closed railway stations in Britain

References

External links
Station history and photos
Luton Borough Council guided busway plans

Buildings and structures in Luton
Disused railway stations in Bedfordshire
Former Great Northern Railway stations
Railway stations in Great Britain opened in 1858
Railway stations in Great Britain closed in 1965
Transport in Luton/Dunstable Urban Area
Beeching closures in England
1858 establishments in England
1965 disestablishments in England